Paşayurdu can refer to:

 Paşayurdu, Aziziye
 Paşayurdu, Çayırlı